Tatau is a town, and the capital of the Tatau District in Bintulu Division, Sarawak, east Malaysia. 

Tatau may also refer to:

Places
Tatau District, Bintulu Division, Sarawak, Malaysia
Tatau Island, an island of the Tabar Group of Papua New Guinea

People
 Tatau Nishinaga, the fifth president of Toyohashi University of Technology

Other uses
Tatau (TV series), 2015 UK TV drama series
 Tatau, the word for tattoo in Samoa; the traditional male tatau is the Pe'a and the female equivalent is the Malu